Perrotia howa is a butterfly in the family Hesperiidae. It is found in Madagascar (central, east and Nosy Be). The habitat consists of forests.

References

Butterflies described in 1876
Erionotini
Butterflies of Africa
Taxa named by Paul Mabille